Yeshiva Meor Hatalmud is a Yeshiva in New York City headed by Moshe Weiss.

Overview 
Meor Hatalmud was founded in 2005 by Rabbi Moshe Weiss.

It was originally only a Yeshiva Ketana, but as the Yeshiva grew and a demand for a Yeshiva Gedolah increased, he began working on a Yeshiva Gedolah. In 2017 the rosh yeshiva opened his Yeshiva Gedolah in Flatbush as a temporary solution, meanwhile working on fundraising and planning a lasting and final destination for the Yeshiva. In winter of 2018 the yeshiva was to be temporarily located in the Borough Park neighborhood of Brooklyn.

In spring of 2018 he opened his Yeshiva Gedolah in Bayswater, New York.

The Yeshiva Ketana serves students from the age of 14 to 17 and has an enrollment of 128 boys, grades 9–12. The Yeshiva Gedolah serves students from the age of 17 to 22.

Studies
They study the Talmud, praying, Jewish Law, Musar, Chasidus, and all the Jewish Studies.

Students
Most of the students are from New York and around, but there are a few students from outside the United States.

After Graduation
The students typically go to Israel where they continue to study, until they get married. There are also students that go to a local Yeshiva.

References 

2002 establishments in New York City
Orthodox yeshivas in Brooklyn